The minor tractates (Hebrew: מסכתות קטנות, masechtot qetanot) are essays from the Talmudic period or later dealing with topics about which no formal tractate exists in the Mishnah. They may thus be contrasted to the Tosefta, whose tractates parallel those of the Mishnah.

Each minor tractate contains all the important material bearing on a single subject. While they are mishnaic in form and are called "tractates," the topics discussed in them are arranged more systematically than in the Mishnah; for they are eminently practical in purpose, being, in a certain sense, the first manuals in which the data scattered through prolix sources have been collected in a brief and comprehensive form.

There about 15 minor tractates. The first eight or so contain much original material; the last seven or so are collections of material scattered throughout the Talmud. Ancient authorities mention especially seven such tractates, which are doubtless the earliest ones. Their name and form suggests that they originated in the period of oral tradition which was dominated by the Talmud and the Midrash, so that these treatises are doubtless of great antiquity, some of them having been compiled in their main outlines before even the final redaction of the Talmud in the 6th century.

List
The minor tractates are normally printed at the end of Seder Nezikin in the Talmud. They include:
 Avot of Rabbi Natan (Hebrew: אבות דרבי נתן), an expansion of Pirkei Avot.
 Soferim (Hebrew: סופרים – Scribes). This tractate appears in two different versions in the Jerusalem and Babylonian Talmuds.
 Evel Rabbati (Hebrew: אבל רבתי – Elaboration on Mourning). Contains laws and customs pertaining to death and mourning, and is sometimes euphemistically called Semakhot ("joys").
 Kallah (Hebrew: כלה – Bride). On engagement, marriage and co-habitation.
 Kallah Rabbati (Hebrew: כלה רבתי – Great Bride). An elaboration of the previous.
 Derekh Eretz Rabbah (Hebrew: דרך ארץ רבה) "Derekh Eretz" literally means "the way of the world," which in this context refers to deportment, manners and behavior.
 Derekh Eretz Zuta (Hebrew: דרך ארץ זוטא) Addressed to scholars, this is a collection of maxims urging self-examination and modesty.
 Perek ha-Shalom (Hebrew: פרק השלום – Chapter of Peace). On the ways of peace between people. It is a final chapter to Derekh Eretz Zuta, often listed separately.
 Sefer Torah (regulations for writing Torah scrolls). Nearly equivalent to the first five chapters of Soferim.
 Mezuzah (Hebrew: מזוזה – scroll affixed to the doorpost).
 Tefillin (Hebrew: תפילין – phylacteries).
 Tzitzit (Hebrew: ציצית – fringes).
 Avadim (Hebrew: עבדים – slaves).
 Gerim (Hebrew: גרים – converts).
 Kutim (Hebrew: כותים – Samaritans).

There is also a lost tractate called "Eretz Yisrael" (about laws pertaining to the Land of Israel). Similarly, a Masechet Hanukkah is mentioned in connection with the Vilna Gaon, but is not extant.

A translation of all of the minor tractates was published in two volumes by Soncino Press; a one-volume edition with the original Hebrew was later issued as part of their set of the Babylonian Talmud. Numerous translations of individual tractates have been produced by other publishers. The Yale Judaica Series includes translations of Avot de-Rabbi Natan and Semahot; the former has been translated at least three other times, and the latter also appears, along with the two Derekh Eretz tractates, in Michael Rodkinson's Talmud translation.

References

External links 

 
Talmud
Mishnah